Beverly Joyce Bailey Harvard (born December 22, 1950) is a former police chief of Atlanta, Georgia, and the first black female police chief of a major city in the United States.

Biography
Beverly Joyce Bailey was born in Macon, Georgia, on December 22, 1950, the youngest of seven children. At the age of 22, she graduated from Morris Brown College in Atlanta with a Bachelor of Arts in sociology. In 1973, her husband, Jimmy, and one of his friends bet her $100 that she could not become a police officer. She accepted the bet and was hired as an officer in the Atlanta Police Department, where she spent several years performing night foot patrols in high-crime areas. In 1979, she was promoted to affirmative action specialist and then to director of public affairs in 1980, where she handled media inquiries regarding the Atlanta child murders. Her performance handling the media resulted in a promotion to deputy police chief in 1982. Harvard was offered the position of Atlanta Chief of Police in 1994 and was officially confirmed by the city council on October 26, 1994, becoming the first black woman to be a police chief of any major city in the United States. During her tenure as police chief, she dealt with several high-profile incidents, including a corruption scandal, the 1996 Centennial Olympic Park bombing, and the 1997 Otherside Lounge bombing. She chose not to reapply for the position in 2002, instead choosing to become the Deputy Federal Security Director for the Transportation Security Administration at Hartsfield–Jackson Atlanta International Airport.

In 2010, Harvard was nominated by President Barack Obama to become the United States Marshal for the Northern District of Georgia, a position that she held until 2019.

See also
 Penny Harrington

References

Living people
Chiefs of the Atlanta Police Department
Morris Brown College alumni
Georgia State University alumni
1950 births
African-American police officers
African Americans in Georgia (U.S. state)